Louis Macouillard (September 8, 1913 – November 26, 1987) American artist known for his watercolor paintings of travel and marine genres, as well as his work as a commercial illustrator.

Biography 
Louis Macouillard was born on September 8, 1913, in San Francisco, California. He graduated from San Francisco Polytechnic High School and the California Guild of Arts and Crafts (CCAC) in 1934. After graduation, he continued his studies in New York City at the Art Students League of New York (ASL). Later on, he returned to San Francisco to work at the Velvetone Poster Company, as an art director.

He served in the US Navy in the South Pacific during World War II. While serving in the Navy he produced many artworks showcasing his travels that he mailed to his fiancé, which were featured in a six-page spread and cover of the October 1943 issue of Life (magazine).

Macouillard's designed two postage stamps, one of them being the commemorative 6¢ US postage stamp of Daniel Boone issued in September 1968.

In 1963 Macouillard designed a mosaic mural that adorns a mid-century modern bank at 300 S. El Camino Real, San Mateo, California. The mural was constructed by Alfonso Pardiñas of Byzantine Mosaics. It tells the story of A. P. Giannini, the founder of Bank of Italy, and features bold, bright colored and features childlike illustrations in five panels, 25-foot-high.

His work is featured in the permanent collection at Fine Arts Museums of San Francisco (FAMSF), and the Smithsonian American Art Museum. One of his etchings is featured in a scrapbook collage by artist Xavier Martinez and is part of the permanent collection at the Oakland Museum of California.

Personal 
Macouillard married Grace Macouillard (née Harrison) in July 1943. He was also a skilled yachtsman and hand-crafted one of the first trimarans which he sailed on San Francisco Bay. Towards the end of life his time was divided between his homes in San Francisco and in Glen Ellen in Sonoma County. Macouillard died in San Francisco on November 26, 1987.

References

1913 births
1987 deaths
Artists from San Francisco
Art Students League of New York alumni
California College of the Arts alumni
People from Glen Ellen, California